
Macaria is the name of two figures from ancient Greek religion and mythology.

Macaria may also refer to:

Places
Macaria (Arcadia), a town of ancient Arcadia, Greece
Măcăria River, a tributary of the Gilort River in Romania

Arts and entertainment
Macaria (actress) (born 1949), Mexican actress
Macaria (novel), by Augusta Jane Evans, published in 1864

Insects
Macaria (moth), a genus of moth in the family Geometridae
Acrocercops macaria, a moth of family Gracillariidae
Bematistes macaria, a butterfly of family Nymphalidae
Dellamora macaria, a beetle of family Mordellidae
Hilarographa macaria, a moth of family Tortricidae

See also
A Description of the Famous Kingdome of Macaria, a work of utopian fiction, published in England in 1641
Macar
Macarius